Xenia is an unincorporated community in Dallas County, Iowa, United States.

In 1879, Xenia contained a post office, a blacksmith shop, and a schoolhouse.

References

Unincorporated communities in Dallas County, Iowa
Unincorporated communities in Iowa